A list of films produced in Egypt in 1963. For an A-Z list of films currently on Wikipedia, see :Category:Egyptian films.

External links
 Egyptian films of 1963 at the Internet Movie Database
 Egyptian films of 1963 elCinema.com

Lists of Egyptian films by year
1963 in Egypt
Lists of 1963 films by country or language